Henrik Sillanpää (born 24 January 1991 in Tampere) is a Finnish tennis player.

Sillanpää has a career high ATP singles ranking of 505 achieved on 13 July 2015. He also has a career high ATP doubles ranking of 723 achieved on 16 June 2014.

Playing for Finland in Davis Cup, Sillanpää has a win–loss record of 0–2.

External links
 
 
 

1991 births
Living people
Finnish male tennis players
Sportspeople from Tampere